The 2014 Samford Bulldogs football team represented Samford University in the 2014 NCAA Division I FCS football season. They were led by eighth year head coach Pat Sullivan and played their home games at Seibert Stadium. They were a member of the Southern Conference. They finished the season 7–4, 5–2 in SoCon play to finish in a tie for second place.

On December 2, head coach Pat Sullivan stepped down. He finished at Samford with an eight year record of 47–43.

Schedule

Game summaries

@ TCU

In their first game of the season, the Bulldogs lost, 48–14 to the TCU Horned Frogs.

Stillman

In their second game of the season, the Bulldogs won, 52–0 over the Stillman Tigers.

VMI

In their third game of the season, the Bulldogs won, 63–21 over the VMI Keydets.

@ Chattanooga

In their fourth game of the season, the Bulldogs lost, 38–24 to the Chattanooga Mocs.

Mercer

In their fifth game of the season, the Bulldogs won, 21–18 over the Mercer Bears.

Wofford

In their sixth game of the season, the Bulldogs lost, 24–20 to the Wofford Terriers.

@ Furman

In their seventh game of the season, the Bulldogs won, 45–0 over the Furman Paladins.

Concordia

In their eighth game of the season, the Bulldogs won, 55–0 over the Concordia Hornets.

Western Carolina

In their ninth game of the season, the Bulldogs won, 34–20 over the Western Carolina Catamounts.

@ The Citadel

In their tenth game of the season, the Bulldogs won, 20–17 over The Citadel Bulldogs.

@ Auburn

In their eleventh game of the season, the Bulldogs lost, 31–7 to the Auburn Tigers.

References

Samford
Samford Bulldogs football seasons
Samford Bulldogs football